As early as 1914 Tvonica Karbida I Ferolegura Dalmacija owned a ferrochromium smelter in Dugi Rat.

The Boris Kidric aluminum smelter at Sibenik was completely destroyed as a result of the war for independence that erupted in 1991.

History
The town of Rude in the Samoborska Gora Mountains was a source of copper as early as the 16th century. In fact, its copper production at the time "was twice the amount of the total copper production in England and four times that of Norway, reaching one third of the production of the famous Swedish mine in Falun."

There was a metallic ore mine in Zrinski.

Kraševi Zviri was the site of a zinc mine.

Trgovska Gora is "a mining area highly significant in Croatian history".

Pyritised bauxites were mined in Istria's Mirna valley at Minjera from the 16th century, in order to obtain vitriol and alum.

From 1811, there was a sulfur mine in Radoboj.

References

Mining in Croatia